Glubokoe is a district of East Kazakhstan Region in eastern Kazakhstan. The administrative center of the district is the settlement of Glubokoye. Population:

References

Districts of Kazakhstan
East Kazakhstan Region